The Wayward Wife is a 1953 Italian melodrama film directed by Mario Soldati. It was entered into the 1953 Cannes Film Festival. In 2008 the film was selected to enter the list of the 100 Italian films to be saved.

Plot

Cast
 Gina Lollobrigida as Gemma Vagnuzzi
 Gabriele Ferzetti as Il professore Franco Vagnuzzi
 Franco Interlenghi as Paolo Sartori
 Nanda Primavera as La signora Foresi, madre di Gemma
 Marilyn Buferd as Anna Sartori (as Marylin Buferd)
 Barbara Berg as Vannina
 Alda Mangini as Elvira Coceanu
 Renato Baldini as Luciano Vittoni as L'amante di Gemma
 Capt. Vernon Jarratt
 Gianni Luda
 Anna-Maria Sandri
 Milko Skofic
 Alfredo Carpegna as Il conte Sartori (uncredited)
 Rina Franchetti (uncredited)

References

External links

1953 films
1953 drama films
Italian drama films
1950s Italian-language films
Italian black-and-white films
Films based on works by Alberto Moravia
Films directed by Mario Soldati
Melodrama films
1950s Italian films